Novaci is a village in the municipality of  Ub, Kolubara District, Western Serbia. Total number of inhabitants is 711 (census 2011). 
The most important site in the village is the Church of the Nativity of The Most Holy Theotokos, built in 1857.

History
The first written record of name of the village Novaci was in 1827 in Vuk Kardzic's "Danica".

In 1844 there was a  Primary court, elementary school and church. The first teacher in school was in 1842. The new church was built in 1857. Also, Novaci was a centre of Novaci municipality  which includes the villages of Tulari and Zukve.

Geography
The village is situated on both sides of river Tamnava.

Population
The first census was in 1834. There was 343 inhabitants in the village.

1844- 391 inh.
1863- 433
1866- 470
1874- 509
1884- 560
1890- 651
1895- 568
1910- 1094
1916- 717

See also
Andrej Bicenko
Tamnava
Ub, Serbia

References

External links

Populated places in Kolubara District